Matti Jokinen (born 8 February 1936 in Turku, died 5 October 2004 in Espoo) was a sailor from Finland, who represented his country at the 1976 Summer Olympics in Kingston, Ontario, Canada as helmsman in the Soling. With crew members Matti Paloheimo and Reijo Laine they finished in 18th place.

References

1936 births
2004 deaths
Sailors at the 1976 Summer Olympics – Soling
Olympic sailors of Finland
Finnish male sailors (sport)
Sportspeople from Turku